Solid State Communications is a peer-reviewed scientific journal of solid-state physics. The journal specializes in short papers on significant developments in the condensed matter science. The journal was established 1963, when the Journal of Physics and Chemistry of Solids split its letters section to create this journal. Elias Burstein served as founding chief editor until 1992, and was succeeded by Manuel Cardona until 2004, when Aron Pinczuk assumed the role. Pinczuk stepped down in 2020.

The journal is published bimonthly by Elsevier and its current editor-in-chief is François Peeters (University of Antwerp).

Abstracting and Indexing
The journal is abstracted and indexing in the following databases:
Cambridge Scientific Abstracts
Chemical Abstracts
Current Contents/Physics, Chemical, & Earth Sciences
Current Contents/SciSearch Database
Current Contents/Social & Behavioral Sciences
MSCI
Engineering Index
INSPEC
PASCAL/CNRS
Research Alert
SSSA/CISA/ECA/ISMEC
Scopus

External links

Bimonthly journals
English-language journals
Hybrid open access journals
Physics journals
Publications established in 1963